Barbara Bradley Baekgaard (born 1939) is the co-founder, designer, and former Chief Creative Officer of Vera Bradley.

Biography 
Barbara Bradley Baekgaard grew up in Miami Beach, Florida. Her first business was a poler-hanging company. Her husband was the owner of a bag company, Baekgaard, which Barbara Bradley Baekgaard managed after he died.

In 1982, Baekgaard and neighbor Patricia Miller were traveling together. They  noticed how similar women's travel bags looked and wished they had bags to match their own fun and colorful style. They each borrowed $250 and started  making handbags out of high-quality cotton in Baekgaard's basement in Fort Wayne, Indiana, on a ping-pong table. Their business became Vera Bradley, an hommage to Barbara Bradley Baekgaard's mother. Within 3 years of business, the sales of the company reached $1 million.

At the time, the bags seemed like they wouldn't amount to much more than a hobby, as Baekgaard hadn't been in the workforce before. To learn about accounting and other financial aspects of running a business, she and Miller went to SCORE, a nonprofit that provides free business mentoring services to small-business owners. Thanks to that formation, Baekgaard, and Miller would officially launch a handbag and luggage company.

Baekgaard founded the Vera Bradley Foundation for Breast Cancer in 1993 after the loss of her dear friend. In 2010, the year Vera Bradley went public, Barbara Bradley Baekgaard became Chief Creative Officer of Vera Bradley.

In August 2017, she stepped down as Chief Creative Officer of Vera Bradley, succeeded by Beatrice Mac Cabe, but remained active with the Vera Bradley Foundation for Breast Cancer. In 2020, she partnered with Provenance Hotels to open The Bradley hotel in Fort Wayne, which she co-owns. She had already ventured in the hotel business with the Inn by the Sea in Seaside, Florida, which sold it in 2013.

Publications 

 Vera Bradley: Our Favorite Recipes, 2000
 A Colorful Way of Living: How to Be More, Create More, Do More the Vera Bradley Way, 2017

Awards 

 2016: Ranked 54th in the Forbes America's Self-Made Women.
2009: Living Legends by the Indiana Historical Society
2007: Country Living Entrepreneur Award
 2006: Gifts and Decorative Accessories Industry Achievement Award

Personal life 
Baekgaard married right after college and had four children in five years. Because of her husband's job, the family moved often. She never had the chance to pursue her passion for entrepreneurship before her 40s. Her husband was of Danish descent. She owns a family house on Lake Gage in Northern Indiana. She lives in Indiana and New York City. 

In 2020, Forbes estimated her wealth to be around $210 million. Barbara Bradley Baekgaard owns 7% of the shares of Vera Bradley.

References 

1939 births
Living people
American women business executives
American women company founders
American fashion designers
American women fashion designers
20th-century American businesspeople
20th-century American businesswomen
21st-century American businesspeople
21st-century American businesswomen
People from Fort Wayne, Indiana
Businesspeople from Indiana